Margaret Mary McCartney is a general practitioner, freelance writer and broadcaster based in Glasgow, Scotland. McCartney is a vocal advocate for evidence-based medicine. McCartney was a regular columnist at the British Medical Journal. She regularly writes articles for The Guardian and currently contributes to the BBC Radio 4 programme, Inside Health. She has written three popular science books, The Patient Paradox, The State of Medicine and Living with Dying. During the COVID-19 pandemic, McCartney contributed content to academic journals and broadcasting platforms, personal blog, and social media to inform the public and dispel myths about coronavirus disease.

Early life and education 
McCartney was born in Scotland, and has said that her earliest ambition was "to be an engineer". She studied medicine at the University of Aberdeen. In 1994, McCartney earned her medical degree from the University of Aberdeen School of Medicine and Dentistry. In 1995, she completed her General Medical Council registration.

Career 
McCartney is a general practitioner based in Glasgow, Scotland, contracted to NHS Greater Glasgow and Clyde. McCartney started popular science writing after reading a misleading newspaper article claiming health benefits associated with CT scanning.

From 2013 to 2018, McCartney wrote regular columns for the British Medical Journal (BMJ), through which she debunked medical claims that were not rooted in evidence.

McCartney is a regular contributor to the BBC Radio 4 programme Inside Health and has contributed to other science-related programming. McCartney uses her time on air to share evidence about topics related to public health, for example the lack of evidence surrounding the sugary drink tax or recommendation to drink eight glasses a day of water. She has written and hosted her own radio shows, including Farewell Doctor Finlay and Tell Me Where It Hurts, which looked at historical and contemporary GP practise in the National Health Service.

Alongside her writing and broadcasting, McCartney has campaigned for doctors to be required to provide conflict of interest statements to their patients. At the time, access to this type of information was becoming increasingly important – the commercialisation of healthcare was resulting in confusing guidelines that did not protect patients. "Conflict of Interest" could include disclosing whether they are a paid consultant for or have been trained by a drug company when prescribing drugs. She argued that as doctors have to disclose this information to their employers each year, the General Medical Council should be able provide this detail to members of the public. Her proposal was backed by Ben Goldacre, Trish Groves and Iain Chalmers. As part of this campaign, McCartney and colleagues set up the website whopaysthisdoctor.org, which collected and shared details on the commercial interests of physicians.

McCartney established the Royal College of General Practitioners working group on overdiagnosis, which she defined as "the application of diagnoses and treatments for patients that are of little or no value". As part of her campaigning work, she led calls for general practitioners and pharmacists to not recommend or prescribe homeopathic medicine or products. This was approved by the Royal College of General Practitioners in 2015, who made a statement outlining their commitment to evidence-based medicine.

She has provided evidence before government on the need for healthcare providers in both the public and private sector to be more transparent about the risks and benefits of health screening. She pointed out that private screening companies could make claims such as, “we’ve saved thousands of lives”, in advertising materials, irrespective of whether these claims were grounded in evidence. McCartney has shown that the outcomes of these evidence-free, private screenings, which were not sanctioned by the UK National Screening Committee, often resulted in an additional burden for the National Health Service. McCartney has argued that 'sexed up' medicine; in which people make medical decisions based on overselling, incomplete information and unfair claims, is bad of people's health. As part of her campaigning efforts, she contacted the Advertising Standards Authority, who upheld her complaints on the use of misleading information and non-evidence based inspections. In 2016 McCartney joined Phil Hammond for a month long show at the Edinburgh Festival Fringe, where the pair urged the audience to protect the National Health Service from "market mayhem".

Throughout the COVID-19 pandemic McCartney was a regular guest on Inside Health, discussing the drug trial, health inequality, the impact of smoking on coronavirus disease prognosis and importance of personal protective equipment. In March 2020 she called for more COVID-19 testing of frontline workers, pointing out that over the course of two days, their workload had increased by 40%. Writing in The Lancet, McCartney described the impact of the COVID-19 pandemic on the medical community, “The NHS has told people for years that it 'puts patients at the hearts of all we do'. I suspect most doctors, frustrated at bureaucracy and barriers, would disagree. That it has taken a global crisis, which is killing patients and health-care staff, and which will have profound psychological sequelae, to make this happen, is catastrophic, and an unpayable price”.

She is a patron of HealthWatch UK, a charity which challenges poor evidence in health reporting, as well as an honorary fellow of the Centre for Evidence-Based Medicine.

Personal life
McCartney lives in Glasgow. She has three children.

Leadership
 2018-2020: Royal College of General Practitioners, Senior fellow for Evidence and Values 
 2020: CSO career research fellow
 2020: Royal College of General Practitioners, Trustee and council member
 2022: Beira's Place, Board of Directors member

Awards and honours
 2008: HealthWatch Award
 2009: Cancerworld, Best Cancer Reporter Award
 2016: Pulse Today, Pulse Power 50
2016: PPA Columnist of the Year
 2017: New York Festivals World's Best Radio Programs Finalist
 2018: Pulse Today, Pulse Power 50

Selected works and publications

Selected works

Selected publications

References

External links 
 
 Margaret McCartney at The Guardian

Living people
Year of birth missing (living people)
British women medical doctors
Alumni of the University of Aberdeen
Scottish women medical doctors
20th-century Scottish medical doctors
21st-century Scottish medical doctors
20th-century Scottish women